Syb-prII-1 is a β-type neurotoxin from the venom of the scorpion Olivierus martensii. It reduces the activity and the expression of the voltage-gated sodium channel Nav1.8.

Source 
Syb-prII-1 is a neurotoxin isolated from the venom of the Chinese scorpion Olivierus martensii, previously known as Buthus martensii.

Chemistry 
Syb-prII-1 is part of the family of β-scorpion toxins. This protein contains 62 amino acids and consists of three β-sheets and an α-helix, held together by four cross-linked disulfide bonds. It has 78.69% sequence identity with the neurotoxin LqhIT2.

Target and mode of action 
Syb-prII-1 binds to the voltage-gated sodium channel (VGSC) Nav1.8. It specifically targets receptor site 4, causing a leftward shift in the voltage dependency of both activation and inactivation. No significant effects on the voltage dependency of Nav1.9 has been observed. In addition, Syb-prII-1 inhibits the peak amplitude of Nav1.8 currents with an IC50 of 133 nM and a maximum inhibition of 52%. No significant inhibition of Nav1.9 was observed. 
Syb-prII-1 also reduces the phosphorylation level of several proteins within the MAPKs pathway, which is associated with neuropathic pain. This in turn reduces the expression of Nav1.8, reducing the current even further

Therapeutic use 
Syp-prII-1 exerts an anti-inflammatory effect by reducing the expression of inflammatory cytokines IL-1β, IL-6, and TNF-α. It also asserts an analgesic effect by partially blocking the current through Nav1.8. For this reason, this has been explored as a possible treatment for trigeminal neuralgia.

References 

Ion channel toxins
Scorpion toxins